Trifănești is a commune in Florești District, Moldova. It is composed of two villages, Alexandrovca and Trifănești.

References

Communes of Florești District